

Eckart Afheldt (15 August 1921 – 3 December 1999) was a German general in the Bundeswehr. During World War II, he served as an officer in the Wehrmacht and was a recipient of the Knight's Cross of the Iron Cross of Nazi Germany. He joined the Bundeswehr in 1956 and retired in 1981 as a Brigadegeneral.

Awards and decorations
 Iron Cross (1939) 2nd Class (19 May 1941)  & 1st Class (16 October 1942)
 Knight's Cross of the Iron Cross on 17 March 1945 as Oberleutnant and commander of II./Jäger-Regiment 2 "Brandenburg"

References

 
 

1921 births
1999 deaths
People from Szczecinek
People from the Province of Pomerania
Bundeswehr generals
Recipients of the Knight's Cross of the Iron Cross
German prisoners of war in World War II held by the Soviet Union
Brigadier generals of the German Army